Arne Bang-Hansen (September 8, 1911 – February 23, 1990) was a Norwegian actor that performed at the National Theater in Oslo for many years.

Acting career
Arne Bang-Hansen played a total of 155 roles at the National Theater, where he worked from 1932 to 1982. For many, he is better known as the voice actor for Chief of Police Bastian in the audiobook version of Thorbjørn Egner's When the Robbers Came to Cardamom Town. Many also know him from the role of Professor Slatters in the TV series Brødrene Dal og spektralsteinene (The Dal Brothers and the Spectral Stones).

At the National Theater, Bang-Hansen already made a name for himself as a student in August Strindberg's To Damascus. In addition to the National Theater, he was at times employed at venues such as the National Theater in Bergen (1934–1938), Carl Johan Theater (1941–1945), Central Theater (1945–1948), and Trøndelag Theater (1948–1949). After that he worked again at the National Theater from 1948 until his death. His moody comedy art came to fruition in Holberg comedies such as Henrich og Pernille and as Styver in Henrik Ibsen's Love's Comedy. He proved to be an astute humanist in the role of Gibbs in T. S. Eliot's The Cocktail Party, Leonid in Anton Chekhov's The Cherry Orchard, and Kroll in Ibsen's Rosmersholm. One must also mention his role as the lecturing monkey in Franz Kafka's monologue "A Report to an Academy." In his farewell role, he played the concierge in Macbeth by William Shakespeare.

Bang-Hansen also appeared in several films; among them he played the lead roles in Hu Dagmar (1939) and Alle tiders kupp (1964). He had supporting roles in films such as Kasserer Jensen (1954), Støv på hjernen (1959), and Sønner av Norge (1961). On television, he is remembered for his role as Professor Slatters in the series Brødrene Dal og spektralsteinene in 1982, and as the groom's father in the episode "Hjem, kjære hjem" (Home, Dear Home) from 1981 in the Norwegian comedy series Fleksnes Fataliteter.

Arne Bang-Hansen received the Order of St. Olav for his achievements as an actor.

Personal relationships
Arne Bang-Hansen was openly gay, and he described his life in his autobiography Fra mitt skjeve hjørne (From My Queer Corner) in 1985.

Filmography
 1934: Sangen om Rondane as Greta's brother Arne
 1939: Hu Dagmar as Sjur
 1953: Brudebuketten as Stockholmsfarer
 1953: Skøytekongen
 1954: Kasserer Jensen as the ferryman
 1955: Den standhaftige tinnsoldat as the narrator
 1959: Støv på hjernen
 1960: Millionær for en aften as the commercial director of the Phoenix Theater
 1961: Sønner av Norge as Baltzersen, a tax official
 1962: Sønner av Norge kjøper bil as Baltzersen, a tax official
 1964: Alle tiders kupp as Teodor Halvorsen, a writer
 1969: An-Magritt as Filip Degn
 1969: Himmel og helvete as chief physician Trosdahl
 1970: Skal vi leke gjemsel? as the station master
 1975: Skraphandlerne as Uncle Arne
 1978: Autumn Sonata as Uncle Otto
 1979: Lucie as Pastor Brandt
 1982: Leve sitt liv as Hilmar
 1985: Smugglarkungen as Slemdal

Television
 1973: Benoni og Rosa (NRK Television Theater)
 1978: Twigs (miniseries) (NRK Television Theater)
 1979: Ridder Runde og hans kamp mot drager og baroner as Sir Enebær, Skippo, and Skjære
 1980: Herfra til Haglemoen as Colonel Flammerød
 1981: "Fleksnes Hjem, kjære hjem" as the groom's father
 1982: Brødrene Dal og spektralsteinene as Professor Slatters

References

External links
 
 Arne Bang-Hansen at Sceneweb
 Arne Bang-Hansen at Filmfront

1911 births
1990 deaths
20th-century Norwegian male actors
Male actors from Oslo